Callan is a given name and surname of Irish and Scottish origin. It can derive from Ó Cathaláin, meaning descendant of Cathalán. Callan can also be an Anglicized form of the Gaelic Mac Allin or Mac Callin. Notable people with the name include:

Surname
 Aela Callan, Australian news reporter
 Alan Callan (died 2014), U.S. businessman, musician, and filmmaker
 Clair Armstrong Callan (1920–2005), U.S. politician
 Colm Callan (born 1923), Irish rugby player
 Curtis Callan (born 1942), U.S. physicist 
 Dave Callan (born 1975) Irish-Australian comedian
 David Callan, Australian standup comedian
 Dennis Callan (1932–2006), Welsh footballer
 H. G. Callan (1917–1993), British biologist
 Hughie Callan (1881–1917), Australian footballer 
 James Callan, cofounder of Spiritus Christi Roman Catholic splinter group
 James L. Callan (1910–1991), U.S. businessman and politician
 John Callan O'Laughlin (1873–1949), U.S. military journalist
 K Callan (born 1942), U.S. actress
 Kevin Callan (born 1963), Canadian canoe enthusiast, teacher, and author
 Michael Callan (1935–2022), U.S. actor
 Michael Feeney Callan, Irish writer, filmmaker, and painter
 Nicholas Callan (1799–1864), Irish priest and physicist
 Oliver Callan, Irish radio satirist
 Paul Callan (born 1939), British print journalist
 Peter M. Callan (1894–1965), U.S. politicians
 Philip Callan (born 1837), Irish MP
 Ricky Callan (1961–2016), Scottish actor
 Robert Emmet Callan, United States Army Coast Artillery officer
 Thomas J. Callan (1853–1908), U.S. soldier at the Battle of Little Big Horn 
 Tim Callan (born 1984), Australian footballer

Title
 George Agar, 1st Baron Callan (1751–1815), Anglo-Irish politician and peer

Given name
 Callan Beasy (born 1982), Australian rules footballer
 Callan McAuliffe (born 1995), Australian actor
 Callan Mulvey (born 1975), Australian actor
 Callan Pinckney (born 1939/40), U.S. fitness advisor
 Callan Ward (born 1990), Australian rules footballer

Fictional names
 David Callan, a titular character of Callan (TV series)
 Eileen Callan, a character in the UK soap opera Family Affairs

References